The 1999 All-Ireland Senior Hurling Championship was the 36th staging of the All-Ireland Under-21 Hurling Championship since its establishment by the Gaelic Athletic Association in 1964. The championship began on 2 June 1999 ended on 21 September 1999.

Cork entered the championship as the defending champions, however, they were beaten by Clare in the Munster semi-final.

On 19 September 1999, Kilkenny won the championship following a 1-13 to 0-14 defeat of Galway in the All-Ireland final. This was their 7th All-Ireland title overall and their first in five championship seasons.

Kilkenny's Henry Shefflin was the championship's top scorer with 4-24.

Results

Leinster Under-21 Hurling Championship

Quarter-finals

Semi-finals

Final

Munster Under-21 Hurling Championship

Quarter-finals

Semi-finals

Final

Ulster Under-21 Hurling Championship

Semi-finals

Final

All-Ireland Under-21 Hurling Championship

Semi-finals

Final

Championship statistics

Top scorers

Top scorers overall

References

Under
All-Ireland Under-21 Hurling Championship